Franz Joseph I, Prince of Liechtenstein, born Franz de Paula Josef Johann Nepomuk Andreas (19 November 1726 – 18 August 1781), was the Prince of Liechtenstein from 1772 until his death.

Biography 
Born in Milan, in what is now northern Italy, he was the son of Prince Emanuel of Liechtenstein and Maria Anna Antonia, Countess of Dietrichstein-Weichselstädt, Baroness zu Hollenburg und Finkenstein (10 September 1706 – 7 June 1777). Franz Josef was the eldest of their thirteen children. He was a nephew of Joseph Wenzel I, whom he succeeded on 10 February 1772.

Franz Joseph had been recognised heir to Liechtenstein since 1723, when his uncle's only son had died. Joseph Wenzel took Franz Joseph under his wing and Franz Joseph accompanied him in a campaign in Northern Italy, fighting with Wenzel at the Battle of Piacenza. The battle was a victory for the Holy Roman Empire, of which Liechtenstein was a part.

He was the 802nd Knight of the Order of the Golden Fleece in Austria.

In 1763, Franz Josef traveled on behalf of the Emperor to Spain, to bring the bride of Archduke Leopold a picture of the Archduke. In 1767, he became Privy Councillor, and in 1771, he received the Order of the Golden Fleece.

Once Franz Joseph became Prince of Liechtenstein, he showed great interest in its economic problems and the ever-increasing Liechtenstein art collection. He died in Metz in 1781.

Marriage and issue
Franz Josef married Marie Leopoldine Gräfin von Sternberg (Vienna, 11 December 1733 – Feldsberg, 27 June 1809), a member of the Bohemian nobility, on 6 July 1750 in Valtice or Feldsberg. The couple had 8 children: 
 Joseph Franz de Paula Emanuel Philipp Isaias (Vienna, 6 July 1752 – Vienna, 17 February 1754)
 Leopoldina Maria Anna Francisca de Paula Adelgunda (Vienna, 30 January 1754 – Frankfurt, 16 October 1823), married in Felsberg on 1 September 1771 Karl Emanuel, Landgrave of Hesse-Rheinfels-Rotenburg, and had issue
 Maria Antonia Aloysia Walburga Mechthildis (Vienna, 14 March 1756 – Vienna, 1 December 1821), a Nun
 Franz de Paula Joseph (Vienna, 19 May 1758 – Vienna, 15 August 1760)
 Aloys I, Prince of Liechtenstein (1759–1805)
 Johann I Joseph, Prince of Liechtenstein (1760–1836)
 Philipp Joseph Aloys Martinianus (Vienna, 2 July 1762 – Vienna, 18 May 1802), unmarried and without issue
 Maria Josepha Hermenegilde (Vienna, 13 April 1768 – Hütteldorf, 8 August 1845), married in Vienna on 15 September 1783 Nikolaus 7te Fürst Esterházy von Galántha (Vienna, 12 December 1765 – Como, 24 November 1833), and had issue

References

External links 
 Princely House of Liechtenstein

1726 births
1781 deaths
Nobility from Milan
Knights of the Golden Fleece of Austria
Princes of Liechtenstein
18th-century Liechtenstein people